Dentin sialophosphoprotein is a precursor protein for other proteins found in the teeth. It is produced by cells (odontoblasts) inside the teeth (dental pulp), and in smaller quantities by bone tissues (osteoblasts and osteocytes). It is required for normal hardening (mineralisation) of teeth. During teeth development, it is broken down into three proteins such as dentin sialoprotein (DSP), dentin glycoprotein (DGP), and dentin phosphoprotein (DPP). These proteins become the major non-collagenous components of teeth. Their distribution in the collagen matrix of the forming dentin suggests these proteins play an important role in the regulation of mineral deposition.  Additional evidence for this correlation is phenotypically manifested in patients with mutant forms of dentin sialophosphoprotein.  Such patients suffer dental anomalies including type III dentinogenesis imperfecta.

It is coded by a gene of the same name (dentin sialophosphoprotein, or DSPP) present on human chromosome 4. This gene encodes two principal proteins of the dentin extracellular matrix of the tooth. The preproprotein is secreted by odontoblasts and cleaved into dentin sialoprotein and dentin phosphoprotein. Dentin phosphoprotein is thought to be involved in the biomineralization process of dentin. Mutations in this gene have been associated with dentinogenesis imperfecta-1; in some individuals, dentinogenesis imperfecta occurs in combination with an autosomal dominant form of deafness. Allelic differences due to repeat polymorphisms have been found for this gene.

References

Further reading

Teeth
Extracellular matrix proteins
Precursor proteins